Thomas John Morris (September 24, 1837 – June 6, 1912) was a United States district judge of the United States District Court for the District of Maryland.

Education and career

Born in Baltimore, Maryland, Morris received an Artium Baccalaureus degree from Harvard University in 1856 before reading law to enter the bar in 1861. He was a commissioner for the Baltimore City Government from 1856 to 1878, and was in private practice in Baltimore from 1861 to 1879.

Federal judicial service
On July 1, 1879, Morris was nominated by President Rutherford B. Hayes to a seat on the United States District Court for the District of Maryland vacated by Judge William Fell Giles. Morris was confirmed by the United States Senate on July 1, 1879, and received his commission the same day. Morris served in that capacity until his death on June 6, 1912, in Baltimore. He was the last federal judge in active service to have been appointed by President Hayes.

References

Sources
 

1837 births
1912 deaths
Judges of the United States District Court for the District of Maryland
United States federal judges appointed by Rutherford B. Hayes
19th-century American judges
Harvard College alumni
19th-century American politicians
United States federal judges admitted to the practice of law by reading law
Gettysburg College alumni